Dražen Katunarić (born 25 December 1954) is a Croatian poet, essayist, novelist and editor.

Early life and education
Katunarić was born in 1954 in Zagreb where he spent his childhood and completed secondary schooling. He studied philosophy at the University of Human Sciences in Strasbourg. 1977. B. A. in Philosophy. 1978. M. A.

Career
1991–1993 Editor of the Literary Journal "Lettre internationale" – Croatian Edition. 
Since 1993, editor in chief of the Literary Journal The Bridge and The European Messenger (HDP).
2001–2006 Vice-president of Croatian P.E.N. centre.Croatian P.E.N. centar

Since 1980 he has published poems, essays, travelogues, novels, tales, articles in Croatian and foreign reviews and translated into French, English, Spanish, Italian, Hungarian, Bulgarian, Slovenian, Romanian, Macedonian, Albanian, German, and Corsican.

Selected bibliography
Bacchus in marble (poems), Zagreb 1983
Sand Trap (poems), Zagreb 1985
Imposture (poems), Zagreb 1987
At Sea (poems), Zagreb 1988
Psalms (poems), Zagreb 1990
The Abrupt Voice (poems), Zagreb 1991
The House of Decadence (essays), Zagreb 1992
Sky/Earth (poems), Zagreb 1993
Church, Street, Zoo (travelogue) Zagreb 1994
The Return of the Barbarogenius (essays), Zagreb 1995
The Poem of Stjepan (poems), Zagreb 1996
Diocletian's Palace (essays), Zagreb-Split 1997
The Story of the Cave (essays), Zagreb 1998
Glue for Nightingale (poems), Zagreb 1999
The Readed Heart (selected poems), Zagreb 1999
Parabola (poems) Zagreb 2001
Fatal Image (novel), Zagreb 2002
Tiger Balm (tales), Zagreb, 2005
The Lyre/Delirium (poems), Zagreb 2006
The beggar woman (novel), Zagreb, 2009
Infernet and Others Texts (essay), Zagreb 2010
Chronos (poems), Zagreb 2011
One Day it Was a Night (selected and new poems), 2015
The Smile of Padre Pio (novel), Zagreb 2017
Sign of the Shadow (poems), 2017
Farewell, Desert (novel), Zagreb 2022

Published books abroad
Ecclesia invisibilis (selected poems), Academia Orient. Occident, Bucurest, 2001
Isolomania (selected poems), Albiana, Ajaccio, France, 2004
Cherries (selected poems), Blue Aster Press, N.Y., 2004
Kthimi i barbrogjenive, Ditet e Naimit, Tetove 2007
Ciel/Terre, L'Arbre à paroles", Amay, 2008
Le baume du tigre, Mode Est-Ouest, Bruxelles, 2009
Die Bettlerin, Leykam, Graz, 2009
La mendiante, Mode Est-Ouest, Bruxelles, 2012.
Cer/Pămînt, Cronedit, Iaşi, 2016
Poem efemer, ronedit, Iaşi, 2016
La maison du déclin, M.E.O. Editions, Bruxelles, 2017
Cronos, Krivodol, Buenos Aires, 2017

Awards
1984. "Branko Radičević" Award for the best poetry book in Yugoslavia
1994. "Tin Ujević" - Croatian Writers Association Award for the best poetry book in 1993
1999. Award of Matrix Croatica for Literature for the best collection of poetry in 1998
1999. "European Circle Award" for Literature
1999. The title "Knight of Arts and Literature" by French Ministry of Culture
2002. Macedonian Price "Menada", "for the specific value of poetry"
2009. Austrian Steiermaerkische Sparkasse price for the novel "The beggar woman" (Die Bettlerin)
2015. Balcanica Price for poetry (Romania)
2018. "Dragutin Tadijanović" Award for the collection of poetry "Sign of the Shadow"

References

External links 
 Dražen Katunarić, Hrvatsko društvo pisaca, www.hrvatskodrustvopisaca.hr
 Dražen Katunarić, Ustanak snova (pjesme), Vijenac, 330/2006.
 Dražen Katunarić, Dvorac grofa Drakule (proza), Kolo, 3/2004.
 Andrija Tunjić, Dražen Katunarić: Barbarogenij je junak našeg doba, Vijenac, 547/2015.

Croatian poets
Croatian novelists
Croatian essayists
1954 births
Living people